Lincoln Regional Airport  (Karl Harder Field) is a public airport three miles (5 km) west of Lincoln, in Placer County, California. It is owned by the City of Lincoln.

Most U.S. airports use the same three-letter location identifier for the Federal Aviation Administration and International Air Transport Association, but Lincoln Regional Airport is LHM to the FAA and has no IATA code.

Facilities

In the year ending June 10, 1993, the airport had 71,000 aircraft operations, average 194 per day: 96% general aviation and 4% air taxi. 207 aircraft are based at the airport: 92% single engine, 7% multi-engine, 1% jet and <1% helicopters.

World War II
During World War II, the airport was Lincoln  Air Force Auxiliary Field and was an auxiliary training airfield for Mather Army Airfield, California.

See also

 California World War II Army Airfields

References

External links 

Airports in Placer County, California